The World Senior Curling Championships is an annual curling tournament featuring curlers from around the world who are at least 50 years old. Matches at the World Senior Championships are played in 8 ends played instead of the 10 played in most international events.

The tournament began in 2002 with only 7 men's teams and 4 women's teams but has since expanded.

The 2020 event was cancelled on March 14, 2020 due to the COVID-19 pandemic.

Results

Men

Women

Medal tables
As of 2022 World Championships

Men

Women

Overall

References

External links
World Curling Federation Archived Results

 
Senior
Senior curling